Albert Whiggs Easmon (1865 – 21 May 1921) was a Sierra Leonean Creole doctor and the half-brother of Dr John Farrell Easmon. Easmon was among the first group of Sierra Leoneans to qualify as a medical doctor after getting a degree from Edinburgh University. He became the leading gynaecologist in Freetown, Sierra Leone and had an extensive private practice.

Background and early life

Albert Whiggs Easmon was born to Walter Richard Easmon (1824-1883) and Mah Serah, a Susu from modern-day Guinea. Albert Easmon's father belonged to a prominent Nova Scotian Settler Easmon family of Little East Street, Freetown. Albert Whiggs Easmon was the younger half brother of Dr. John Farrell Easmon, who was promoted to the position of Chief Medical Officer of the Gold Coast.

Education
Albert Whiggs Easmon enrolled in Edinburgh University to study medicine; he qualified in 1895, graduating with First Class Honours.

Influenza epidemic

He was reportedly the only physician who did not contract influenza during the 1918-19 influenza epidemic in Freetown. According to his son Raymond S. Easmon: "Father had literally to doctor the whole city."

Paralysis and death

Soon after the epidemic, Easmon had a stroke that paralysed the right side of his body, leaving him bedridden for two years until his death on 26 May 1923, at the age of 56.

Family
Albert Whiggs Easmon had at least two children; Dr Raymond Sarif Easmon and Maserae Easmon.

References

Sierra Leone Creole people
1865 births
1923 deaths
Albert Whiggs
Alumni of the University of Edinburgh
People from Freetown
Sierra Leonean gynaecologists
People educated in Freetown, Sierra Leone
Sierra Leonean people of African-American descent
Fourah Bay College alumni